Adam Airport  is an air base and proposed domestic airport situated in the Adam wilayah of the Ad Dakhiliyah Region of Oman.

Runway length does not include  displaced thresholds on each end. A VOR-DME is located on the field.

See also
Transport in Oman
List of airports in Oman

References

External links
  Oman Airports
OpenStreetMap - Adam Airport
OurAirports - Adam Airport

Airports in Oman